The Medium Tank M1922 was an inter-war period medium tank built in the United States. It was largely a variant of the Medium Tank M1921, with some changes to use the same track suspension system that had been developed for the Medium Mark D.

The M1922 was initially the second tank in an order for two M1921s placed in April 1920 but the order was changed to one M1921 to the original design and one using the cable track system

Specifications
Like the M1921, the M1922 was essentially a box-shaped tank with a mildly sloped front. It had a round turret, with a 57mm gun.
The armour was the same as the M1921. The cable suspension system, similar to that of the earlier British Medium Mark D, was superior to other tanks of the era, and it was faster than the M1921.

Use/deployment 
11 were produced, and it was only used for testing. A 16-ton limit was imposed on tanks because of the load on bridges and roads in the United States, which led to the tank being declined for uptake by the military.
One example was preserved in the Ordnance Museum, sometime after 1926. The T1 US tank was based on both the Medium Tank M1921 and the M1922.

Survivors 
There is at least one surviving example in the U.S. Army Armor & Cavalry Collection, Fort Benning, Georgia

References

Year of introduction missing
Interwar tanks of the United States
Medium tanks of the United States
Abandoned military projects of the United States
Trial and research tanks of the United States